Anders Juliussen (born 7 May 1976) is a Norwegian football midfielder.

He started his career in SK Sprint-Jeløy, but later became a stalwart in Moss FK for more than ten seasons, including their unbroken first-tier spell from 1998 through 2002. He rejoined Sprint-Jeløy ahead of the 2007 season, and later the lower-division team Tronvik.

References

1976 births
Living people
People from Moss, Norway
Norwegian footballers
Moss FK players
Eliteserien players
Norwegian First Division players
Association football midfielders
SK Sprint-Jeløy players
Sportspeople from Viken (county)